The 2014 PSL All-Filipino was the first tournament of the Philippine Super Liga for its second season. The tournament began ran from May 16, 2014 to July 26, 2014. The tournament's major sponsor was PLDT Home DSL.

Women's division

Classification round

|}

|}

Playoffs

Quarterfinals

|}

Semi-finals

|}

5th place

|}

3rd place

|}

Women’s Finals

|}

Final standing

Men's division

Classification round

|}

|}

Men’s Finals

|}

Final standing

Awards

Venues
Cuneta Astrodome
University of San Carlos gymnasium

Broadcast partner
Solar Sports

References

Philippine Super Liga
PSL
PSL